Shankarbhai Vegad (born 2 September 1955) is an Indian politician of the Bharatiya Janata Party. From April 2012, he served as a member of the Parliament of India, representing Gujarat State in the Rajya Sabha, the upper house till April 2018. Shankarbhai Vegad belong to the Koli community of Gujarat.

He is a member of the Committee on Petroleum and Natural Gas, and since August 2012 a member of the Committee on Social Justice and Empowerment.

References 

Living people
1955 births
Bharatiya Janata Party politicians from Gujarat
Rajya Sabha members from Gujarat
Koli people
People from Surendranagar district